Bimal Borah is a Bharatiya Janata Party politician from the Indian state of Assam. He was elected in the Assam Legislative Assembly election in 2016 and 2021 from Tingkhong constituency.
He took oath as a cabinet Minister of the Government of Assam on 10 May 2021.

References 

Living people
Bharatiya Janata Party politicians from Assam
Assam MLAs 2016–2021
People from Dibrugarh district
Year of birth missing (living people)
Assam MLAs 2021–2026